Rosalind S. Helderman (born October 3, 1978) is a journalist in the United States. She is currently a political enterprise and investigations reporter for The Washington Post.

Biography
Helderman was born to Hal and Phyllis Helderman and raised in metropolitan Nashville, Tennessee. Her family is Jewish. She graduated from the West End Synagogue’s Beit Miriam Religious School and earned a B.A. in history from Harvard University in 2001.

Helderman joined The Post as a reporter in 2001. She was initially a general assignment reporter for the newspaper until she was promoted in 2014 to The Post's national political investigations and enterprise team for the 2014 and 2016 election cycles. She is a regular contributor to MSNBC.

Helderman was named Outstanding Journalist of the Year by the Virginia Press Association; won a George Polk Award in 2014; and was one of the investigators whose coverage of Donald Trump's 2016 presidential campaign won a 2018 Pulitzer Prize.

Works
 Introduction and analysis with Matt Zapotosky for the Mueller Report by The Washington Post

References

External links 

Rosalind Helderman on Twitter

Living people
Harvard University alumni
The Washington Post journalists
Jewish American journalists
George Polk Award recipients
Pulitzer Prize for National Reporting winners
21st-century American journalists
American women journalists
People from Nashville, Tennessee
American newspaper journalists
21st-century American women
21st-century American Jews
1978 births